Donald Davis (August 14, 1904 – March 28, 1992) was an American playwright and screenwriter. He wrote the play and film adaptations of The Good Earth, among others.

A native of New York City, Davis later moved to Palm Beach, Florida, where he died. He was married to actress Dorothy Matthews. His father was the playwright Owen Davis.

Selected filmography
 Two Flaming Youths (1927)
 Dangerous Curves (1929)
 Rough Romance (1930)
 Damaged Lives (1933)
 The Good Earth (1937)
 City Without Men (1943)

References

External links

1904 births
1992 deaths
20th-century American dramatists and playwrights
American male screenwriters
American male dramatists and playwrights
20th-century American male writers
20th-century American screenwriters
Writers from New York City
Screenwriters from New York (state)